Filippo Serena (born 12 October 1999) is an Italian professional footballer who plays as a midfielder.

Club career
He made his Serie C debut for Venezia on 7 May 2017 in a game against Maceratese.

On 12 January 2021, he joined Gubbio on loan.

On 15 July 2021, he moved on loan to Grosseto. On 29 January 2022, he returned to Pontedera on loan.

On 29 August 2022, Serena's contract with Venezia was terminated by mutual consent.

References

External links
 

1999 births
Living people
Sportspeople from Parma
Italian footballers
Association football midfielders
Serie C players
Serie D players
Venezia F.C. players
U.S. Città di Pontedera players
A.S. Gubbio 1910 players
U.S. Grosseto 1912 players
Footballers from Emilia-Romagna